Dubair Bala is an administrative unit, known as Union council of Kohistan District in the Khyber Pakhtunkhwa province of Pakistan.
It has many sub localities and Neighborhoods like  Dubair Bala, Mujgali, Gaya and Neery.out of these Shaikh Dara is the most popular locality.Because it has highest population.plethora of well-qualified people and beautiful natural places for adventure.(Taki ,Bawoon"Historical mosque, peranokaly etc)and the most remarkable institute is GPS peranokaly.Which provides different opportunities to students and local community in different fields.
District Kohistan has 5 Tehsils i.e. Dassu, Pattan, Palas , Ranolia and Kandian. Each Tehsil comprises a certain number of Union councils. There are 38 Union councils in district Kohistan.

See also 

 Kohistan District, Pakistan

External links
Khyber-Pakhtunkhwa Government website section on Lower Dir
United Nations
 HAJJ website Uploads
 PBS paiman.jsi.com 

Kohistan District, Pakistan
Populated places in Kohistan District, Pakistan
Union councils of Khyber Pakhtunkhwa
Union Councils of Kohistan District, Pakistan